is a Japanese composer and pianist. Some of her songs were also used for the soundtrack of Shusuke Kaneko's Summer Vacation 1999.

Discography (solo albums)
 Kaze no Kagami (Wind and Reflections)/ Sony / 32DP735 -1987
 Toki no Hanataba (Bouquet of Time)/ Sony / 32DP5072 -1988
 Kinu no Bara (Silky Roses) / Sony / CSCS5002 -1989
 Antim / Sony / CSCS5363 -1991
 Atelier no Kyujitsu (Holiday of Atelier)/ FOR LIFE / FLCF3501 -1994
 Dreamy Winter / FOR LIFE / FLCF3533 -1994
 Jet Stream [Single] / FOR LIFE / FLDF1550 -1995
 Yume no Toki he (To Time of Dream) / FOR LIFE / FLCF3598 -1995
 In Concert Piano Fantasy / TRUE PROJECT / PEN1001 -1998
 Solo Best - Dear Green Field / UNIVERSAL / UMCK1068 -2001
 Melodious Life / TRUE PROJECT / PEN1002 -2002
 LOVERS (Koibito tachi) / TOKUMA JAPAN / TKCA72858 -2005
 Korea ga Aishita Piano (Piano Korean loved)－Yuriko Nakamura Best / United Asia Entertainment / JKCA-1024 -2006
 The Place to Return (2007)

References

External links
 A JAPANESE MUSICIAN, YURIKO NAKAMURA'S OFFICIAL SITE

Japanese women pianists
Japanese composers
Japanese women composers
Japanese women musicians
Japanese pianists
Living people
21st-century Japanese pianists
Year of birth missing (living people)
Ferris University alumni
21st-century Japanese women musicians
21st-century women pianists